Thomas Sowunmi (born 25 July 1978) is a retired Hungarian footballer.

Sowunmi was born in Nigeria to a Hungarian mother and a Nigerian Yoruba father and spent the first nine years of his life in the African state. He started playing football aged 13 and began a professional football career with Dunaferr.

Sowunmi left for Vasas Budapest in 1998 but returned to his first club in 2001. He made his first appearance for Hungary in August 1999, in a 1–1 draw against Moldova. Sowunmi was the first person of color to represent Hungary at football. He spent a short spell in France with AC Ajaccio but returned to Hungary with Ferencvaros in 2003. He was signed by FC Slovacko in 2005 but after one season became involved in a dispute with the club. Eventually he was released from his attachment to the Czech team following police and FIFA intervention.

Sowunmi signed for Scottish club Hibernian on 6 February 2007 after impressing manager John Collins while on trial. In just his second match he came on as a half-time substitute in a Scottish Cup quarter-final tie at Queen of the South and scored the decisive goal in a 2–1 win. Sowunmi was released by Hibernian in June, and Sowunmi re-signed for Vasas Budapest in September 2007.

References

External links

Living people
1978 births
Sportspeople from Lagos
Hungarian people of Nigerian descent
Nigerian people of Hungarian descent
Hungarian people of Yoruba descent
Hungarian footballers
Hungary international footballers
Hungary youth international footballers
Hungary under-21 international footballers
Hungarian expatriate footballers
Dunaújváros FC players
Vasas SC players
AC Ajaccio players
Ferencvárosi TC footballers
1. FC Slovácko players
Hibernian F.C. players
BFC Siófok players
APOP Kinyras FC players
FC Ajka players
Nemzeti Bajnokság I players
Scottish Premier League players
Cypriot First Division players
Expatriate footballers in France
Hungarian expatriate sportspeople in France
Expatriate footballers in the Czech Republic
Expatriate footballers in Scotland
Expatriate footballers in Cyprus
Hungarian expatriate sportspeople in the Czech Republic
Hungarian expatriate sportspeople in Scotland
Hungarian expatriate sportspeople in Cyprus
Yoruba sportspeople
Nemzeti Bajnokság II players
Association football forwards